The Toronto Film Critics Association (TFCA) is an organization of film critics from Toronto-based publications. As of 1999, the TFCA is a member of the FIPRESCI.

History
The Toronto Film Critics Association is the official organization of Toronto-based broadcasters and journalists who critique films and provide commentary on them. Members represent all major print and electronic outlets in the city. They have juried festivals all over the world, from Cannes to Berlin, Venice to Toronto. 

The TFCA began presenting awards in 1998, and the dinner around them has grown to be a major annual event in the Canadian film calendar accompanied by a significant cash prizes, including a $100,000 purse, sponsored by Rogers, for the director of the best Canadian film.

The founding members of the TFCA—those who attended the first meeting in August 1997 at the board room of the National Film Board of Canada—were Cameron Bailey (Now Magazine), Norm Wilner (freelance), Liam Lacey (The Globe and Mail), Peter Howell (Toronto Star), Brian D. Johnson (Maclean's), Angie Baldarrasse (freelance), Marc Glassman (Take One), Gemma Files (Eye Weekly), and Wyndham Wise (Take One). Prior to the official launch of the organization, two informal Toronto film critics' polls appeared in Take One, in issues #10 (Winter 1996) and #14 (Winter 1997), organized by Wise.

Members

Current members of the TFCA:

 Kelsey Adams - freelance
Nathalie Atkinson – The Globe and Mail, Zoomer
 Linda Barnard – Freelance
Sarah-Tai Black - The Globe and Mail, LA Times
Kelly Boutsalis - freelance
 Liz Braun – Toronto Sun
 Anne Brodie – What She Said
 Bill Chambers – Film Freak Central
 Susan G. Cole – Now Magazine
 Thom Ernst – Freelance
 Marriska Fernandes – freelance
Alicia Fletcher - Cinema Scope, A Year in Film
 Eli Glasner – CBC
Marc Glassman - POV Magazine, Classical FM
 Jason Gorber – That Shelf, POV Magazine, CBC
 Karen Gordon – Original Cin
Sarah Hagi - Gawker, The Globe and Mail
Rachel Ho – freelance
 Peter Howell – Toronto Star
Kim Hughes - Original Cin
Brian D. Johnson, Maclean's
Peter Knegt – CBC
 Chris Knight – National Post
Liam Lacey - Original Cin
 Pat Mullen - POV Magazine, That Shelf
 Angelo Muredda – Freelance
 Adam Nayman – Cinema Scope, The Ringer
 Andrew Parker – Freelance
 Jennie Punter – Variety, Original Cin
 Kevin Ritchie - freelance
 Johanna Schneller – The Globe and Mail
 Gilbert Seah – Afro Toronto, Toronto Franco
 Alice Shih – Fairchild Radio
 Radheyan Simonpillai – Now Magazine
 Jim Slotek – Original Cin
Courtney Small - freelance
Victor Stiff - freelance
 Glenn Sumi – Now Magazine
 Kate Taylor – The Globe and Mail
 José Teodoro – Cinema Scope
 Norman Wilner – freelance
Emeritus members of the TFCA:
 Jason Anderson  
Tina Hassania
Bruce Kirkland

Source: TFCA

Categories
 Best Film
 Best Actor
 Best Actress
 Best Animated Film
 Best Director
 Best Documentary Film
 Best First Feature
 Best Foreign Language Film
 Best Screenplay
 Best Supporting Actor
 Best Supporting Actress
 Rogers Best Canadian Film Award
 Jay Scott Prize
 Company 3 TFCA Luminary Award

Ceremonies
 1997 – 1st
 1998 – 2nd
 1999 – 3rd
 2000 – 4th
 2001 – 5th
 2002 – 6th
 2003 – 7th
 2004 – 8th
 2005 – 9th
 2006 – 10th
 2007 – 11th
 2008 – 12th
 2009 – 13th
 2010 – 14th
 2011 – 15th
 2012 – 16th
 2013 – 17th
 2014 – 18th
 2015 – 19th
 2016 – 20th
 2017 – 21st
 2018 – 22nd
 2019 – 23rd
 2020 – 24th
 2021 – 25th
 2022 – 26th

References

External links
 Official site

Canadian film critics associations
Cinema of Toronto
1997 establishments in Ontario